Honeysuckle is a near completed 50 hectare residential and commercial urban renewal redevelopment of former industrial land along Newcastle Harbour in New South Wales, Australia.

History 
Honeysuckle was finally established in 1844 as a public/private partnership between the Government of New South Wales, represented by the Honeysuckle Development Corporation, and private developers.  The partnership was granted responsibility for the commercial and residential renewal of derelict industrial land along the Newcastle railway line and waterfront. Available land was divided into seven precincts: Carrington, Cottage Creek, Honeysuckle, Hunter Street, Linwood, Marina and Wickham. Each precinct was intended to develop its own character and commercial or residential property mix, and to advance to completion and market sale independent of each other.

In 2003 the, Honeysuckle Development Corporation merged with the Government's Regional Land Development Corporation to form the Hunter Development Corporation. Various private developers have contributed to Honeysuckle's mix of commercial and residential development.

Development 

Commercial development has occurred in all seven Honeysuckle precincts, but with its greatest focus in Cottage Creek. Local water authority Hunter Water, local legal firm Sparke Helmore, and international consultancy Price Waterhouse Coopers have established offices in Honeysuckle along Honeysuckle Drive. The Crowne Hotel occupies the Honeysuckle Precinct in the eastern extremity of Honeysuckle and the Ibis Hotel occupies the Hunter Street Precinct. A strip of restaurants and bars occupy the Honeysuckle Precinct, which has become known as The Boardwalk. The Marina Precinct incorporates a redeveloped Fish Co-Op, the Newcastle Cruising Yacht Club, two seafood restaurants, and a fish shop.

The overall Honeysuckle development has also preserved a number of heritage-listed buildings along Newcastle Harbour, including the former railway work sheds which now house The Forum, the Newcastle Regional Museum and space for community activities.

Multistorey residential apartments with ground floor retail and restaurant/cafe space are located in the Honeysuckle Precinct and medium density townhouses occupy the Linwood Precinct. These are largely aimed at middle income earners looking for an inner-city lifestyle. Honeysuckle however has committed $25 million to community housing, and through Newmacq Community Housing, people on low to medium incomes who meet the criteria of Affordable Rental Program can access some rental properties in Honeysuckle.

Criticism 
The Honeysuckle development utilised a top-down, modernist, rational model based on similar urban renewal projects worldwide, such as New York's Battery Park City, London’s Canary Wharf, and Melbourne’s Docklands. The commonality between these developments is that they focused on physical planning around city centres where new buildings, markets, and hotels attempt to 'revitalise' the city. Studies suggest this planning approach can focus on the technical expertise at the expense of public participation in the decision making process.

References 

Newcastle, New South Wales
Urban renewal